The Meller Hills ( or Meller Berg) are a small hill range up to a maximum of about  high in the Osnabrück Uplands. They are located in the borough of Melle in the Lower Saxon county of Osnabrück in Germany.

Geography

Location 
Parts of the TERRA.vita Nature Park are located on the Melle Hills. Although they rise around 6 kilometres south of the main ridge of the Wiehen Hills, they are sometimes included as part of the latter. The small hill range lies between the town of Melle to the south, the villages of Bakum in the southwest, and Eicken-Bruche to the south-southeast, the Mell suburb of Buer to the northeast with its villages Barkhausen to the east and Holzhausen to the north and the Melle suburb of Oldendorf to the west; to the north-northwest lies the Melle estate of Gut Ostenwalde. Most of it is drained by the southwest flowing Zwickenbach, whose water flows via the Else and Werre eastwards to the Weser.

Natural regions 
The Melle Hills belong to the major unit group of the Lower Weser Uplands (No. 53), the major unit of the Osnabrück Uplands (535), the sub-unit of Northern Osnabrück Uplands (535.0) and the natural region of the Melle Heights (535.03). The landscape leads west to northwest into the natural area  Schledehauser Hügelland  (535.02). To the south it leads into the natural region of the Else Depression  (531.10), which belongs to the subunit of the Else-Werre-Valley (531.1), and to the east into the natural region of the Quernheim Hills (531.01) and to the north in the natural area of the  Meesdorf Heights (531.00), both of which belong to the major unit of the Ravensberg Hills (531) and subunit of Quernheim Hill Country (531.0).

Surveys 
The elevations of the Melle Hills include  - sorted by height in metres (m) above NHN:
 Adolfsberg ( 220 m, south-south-west summit;  215 m, north-north-east summit) 
 Diedrichsberg (219 m); with the Diedrichsburg
 Eickener Egge ( 207.5 m); with Ottoshöhe observation tower
 Stuckenberg ( 207.5 m); with  Friedenshöhe observation tower

Nature reserves and protected landscapes 
The contiguous forest of the Melle Hills covers around 8 km2. Parts of the "Wiehen Hills and Northern Osnabrück Uplands" (CDDA - No. 390425; 2009 designated; 288,348 km2).

Tourism 
On the Melle Hills is the castle of Diedrichsburg. In the north of the hill range lies the 2 km2 large and enclosed Diedrichsburg Wildlife Park, which was founded in 1963. It has a large population of semi-wild wild boars. It is particularly popular with tourists in spring when there are numerous newcomers to the park. On the Friedenshöhe, a subpeak of the Stuckenberg near Buer is the 28.6-metre-high Friedenshöhe observation tower, which was built in 1988 and which has been expanded into the Klimaturm. On the Ottoshöhe, a hill on the Eickener Egge near the centre of Melle, there is a 28.5 metre- high observation tower.

In addition, the Melle Hills have been made accessible as a local recreation area by the establishment of several hikers' car parks and various regional hiking trails. After its redesign, the TERRA.track called the Zwickenbach Valley Nature Trail ("Naturerlebnispfad Zwickenbachtal") has become a popular destination.

References 
<! ---->

<! ---->

<! ---->

<! ---->

<! ---->

<! ---->

External links 

Mountain ranges of Europe
Hill ranges of Germany
Melle, Germany
Wiehen Hills
Central Uplands
Osnabrück (district)
Natural regions of the Lower Weser Uplands